The 2009 Junior Pan American Artistic Gymnastics Championships was held in Aracaju, Brazil, November 6–8, 2009.

Medal summary

Medal table

References

2009 in gymnastics
Pan American Gymnastics Championships
International gymnastics competitions hosted by Brazil